Kogawa (written: 湖川 or 古川) is a Japanese surname. Notable people with the surname include:

Joy Kogawa (born 1935), Canadian poet and novelist
, Japanese Nordic combined skier
, Japanese animator and character designer

Japanese-language surnames